First Methodist Episcopal Church of Alliance, Ohio is a historic church at 470 E. Broadway Street in Alliance, Ohio.

It was built in 1895 and added to the National Register in 1985.

References

Methodist churches in Ohio
Churches on the National Register of Historic Places in Ohio
Romanesque Revival church buildings in Ohio
Churches completed in 1895
Churches in Stark County, Ohio
National Register of Historic Places in Stark County, Ohio
Alliance, Ohio